Danny Dunn and the Smallifying Machine is the eleventh novel in the Danny Dunn series of juvenile science fiction/adventure books written by Raymond Abrashkin and Jay Williams. The book was first published in 1969.

Summary 
Professor Bullfinch has created a machine for the government which will shrink objects and be used for spying. When Danny sneaks into the lab, he and his friends discover the machine and try to use it for a problem they have been dealing with at school.

Editions 
McGraw-Hill
 Paperback, 1969, illustrated by Paul Sagsoorian
 Hardback, 1969, illustrated by Paul Sagsoorian

MacDonald and Jane's
 Hardback, 1970, illustrated by Barbara Swiderska

Archway Books
 Paperback, 1971, #1 in their series

Pocket Books
 Paperback, 1983 reissue, illustrated by Paul Sagsoorian

Danny Dunn
1969 American novels
1969 children's books
1969 science fiction novels
The novel Lyle Bin has the same thing. Lyle's teacher, John Macarthy, has invented a "shrinking machine", and Lyle accidentally starts shrinking himself. Lyle almost shrinks into nothing.